Echuca Airport  is located  south of Echuca, Victoria, Australia.

See also
 List of airports in Victoria

References

Airports in Victoria (Australia)
Echuca-Moama